Christiansburg Downtown Historic District is a national historic district located at Christiansburg, Montgomery County, Virginia. The district encompasses 32 contributing buildings, 1 contributing site, and 2 contributing objects in the central business district of Christiansburg. The district includes a variety of  one-, two-, or three-story commercial or office buildings built primarily from the 1915-1950 period.  The courthouse square is the cultural and historic center of the district. Notable buildings include the Taylor Office Building (c. 1870), Bank of Christiansburg (1963), Dr. George Anderson House (c. 1800, c. 1890), Zirkle Building (1910), Cromer Furniture Building (c. 1920), Presbyterian Manse (1876), Barnes-Surface Motor Co. (1911, c. 1920), Virginia Inn Hotel (c. 1915, c. 1920), and Leggett's Department Store (1958).  The contributing objects are the Confederate Memorial (1883) and War Memorial (1953). Located in the district and separately listed are Christiansburg Presbyterian Church, U.S. Post Office, and Phlegar Building.

It was listed on the National Register of Historic Places in 2013.

References

External links

Historic districts on the National Register of Historic Places in Virginia
Greek Revival architecture in Virginia
Queen Anne architecture in Virginia
Buildings and structures in Montgomery County, Virginia
National Register of Historic Places in Montgomery County, Virginia